Railaco, officially Railaco Administrative Post, is an administrative post (and was formerly a subdistrict) in Ermera municipality, East Timor. Its seat or administrative centre is Liho, and its population at the 2004 census was 9,293.

References

External links 

  – information page on Ministry of State Administration site 

Administrative posts of East Timor
Ermera Municipality